Darryl Gatwick Hunt (4 May 1950 – 8 August 2022) was an English musician and singer-songwriter, who was best known for playing bass guitar in The Pogues.

Life and career
Hunt was born in Christchurch, Hampshire (now Dorset), England, on 4 May 1950. He was educated at Allhallows College in Lyme Regis,  Devon and went on to study at Nottingham Trent University, where he earned a BA in fine art. At university, he made his first musical foray with The Brothel Creepers, a band formed for a student movie in 1973. This group evolved into the five-piece pub rock band Plummet Airlines in 1974, releasing two singles and an album before breaking up in 1977. 

By the early 1980s, Hunt was DJing and playing with various groups in London at The Pindar Of Wakefield and elsewhere in London. He produced a one-off music fanzine, "Haywire", relating to the club nights at The Pindar Of Wakefield.

He was in the punk rock band The Favourites, and a pop band known as The Lemons, who released a single 7 inch on Coventry-based Race Records in 1981. He performed in a band, Crazeology, who were at least once supported by Pogue Mahone. Another band, Baby Lotion, morphed into lounge act Pride Of The Cross with the addition of Pogue Cait O'Riordan on vocals. Phil Gaston was a supporter of the band, ultimately writing for and producing their only release, a posthumously-released 7" single. However, the band came to an end as The Pogues' popularity increased, leaving O'Riordan unavailable. Hunt & Baby Lotion/Pride of the Cross guitarist Dave Scott then started a new group called The Troubleshooters, which included Debsey Wykes as singer & songwriter. Hunt also performed in a short-lived duo with Gaston called Pearl & Dean, whose material included a song called "The Ballad Of Pogue Mahone", a satirical overview of the members of Pogue Mahone set to the tune of The Old Orange Flute.

Already familiar with the band and having helped them out with rides to gigs in his van, Hunt joined The Pogues as driver, front-of-house sound engineer and road manager for an Autumn 1984 UK/Ireland tour supporting Elvis Costello. This would quickly become a full time job, making an end to his other projects.

Hunt began playing bass in The Pogues in September 1986, after the departure of Cait O'Riordan, and remained their bass player and occasional songwriter for the rest of the band's career. His song "Love You Till The End" appears on the album Pogue Mahone and was used in the credits of the Jay Roach film Mystery, Alaska and used throughout the Richard LaGravenese film P.S. I Love You.

After The Pogues initial break up in 1996, he briefly continued working with Spider Stacy and Andrew Ranken in The Vendettas.  He joined The Pogues reunion in 2001, and continued to play with them through to their 2014 dissolution in the wake of Philip Chevron's death, and also  participated in a Plummet Airlines reunion. In the early 2000s, Hunt founded the indie pop band Bish, ultimately releasing three albums of songs he wrote and produced.

In November 2021, Hunt sold the 1963 Fender Precision Bass that he had used for most of his career with The Pogues via Bonhams auction house in London.

Hunt died in London on 8 August 2022, at the age of 72.

References

General references

External Links
 
 

1950 births
2022 deaths
People from Christchurch, Dorset
People educated at Allhallows College
Alumni of Nottingham Trent University
English bass guitarists
English male guitarists
Male bass guitarists